The 1977 Queen's Club Championships was a tennis tournament played on grass courts at the Queen's Club in London in the United Kingdom that was part of the 1977 Colgate-Palmolive Grand Prix. It was the 75th edition of the tournament and was held from 13 June through 18 June 1977. Raúl Ramírez won the singles title.

Finals

Singles

 Raúl Ramírez defeated  Mark Cox 9–7, 7–5
 It was Ramírez's 1st singles title of the year and the 12th of his career.

Doubles

 Anand Amritraj /  Vijay Amritraj defeated  John Lloyd /  David Lloyd 6–1, 6–2
 It was Anand Amritraj's only title of the year and the 7th of his career. It was Vijay Amritraj's 3rd title of the year and the 16th of his career.

References

External links
 ITF tournament edition details
 ATP tournament profile

 
Queen's Club Championships
Queen's Club Championships
Queen's Club Championships
Queen's Club Championships